Landlocked salmon usually refers to the landlocked subspecies of the Atlantic salmon, Salmo salar sebago.

Other types of salmon spending their entire life cycle in freshwater include:
Kokanee salmon, landlocked sockeye salmon
Oncorhynchus masou formosanus, landlocked masu salmon

See also
Salmon
Landlocked (disambiguation)